Dyr bul shchyl is the earliest and most famous zaum/transrational poem by Aleksei Kruchenykh, written using the Zaum language, which, according to the author, is "more Russian national, than in all of Pushkin's poetry".

The poem was written in December 1912. This date the author then called "the time of occurrence of the phenomenon of Zaum language (i.e. the language that has no utility value), in which are written the whole independent works, and not just parts thereof (as the chorus, sound decoration, etc.)". Initiator of the creation of the work of the "unknown words" was David Burliuk. "Dyr bul shchyl" was published in January 1913 in a series of "three poems" in Kruchenykh's book "Pomada". According to Kruchenykh, this poem was to become much more known than him. Prefacing the poems, he also stated that "its words do not have/a definite meaning".

The poem, in Majorie Perloff's English transliteration, runs:

Dyr bul shchylubesh shchurskumvy so bur l èz

References 

1912 poems
Russian Futurism
Russian poems
Poetry by Aleksei Kruchenykh